Groupe Union Défense (originally named Groupe Union Droit), better known as GUD, is a French far-right students' union formed in the 1960s. After a period of inactivity it relaunched in 2022.

The GUD was based in Panthéon-Assas University, a law school in Paris.

Ideology 

Formed as far-right, anti-communist youth organization, in the mid-1980s, the GUD turned toward support of the Third Position movements and "national revolutionary" theories, as well as embracing anti-Zionism, anti-Americanism and support for Hafez al-Assad.

Culture 
GUD took as symbol the Celtic cross and the comic black rats (rats noirs).

Some music groups of Rock identitaire français had connections with GUD.

History 

In its early period, it was a reactionary bourgeois student movement, and some of its early members went on to become mainstream conservative politicians, including  Gérard Longuet, Hervé Novelli and Alain Madelin.

Members of the GUD participated in the 1969 founding of Ordre Nouveau.

During the 1970s and early 1980s, linked to the Parti des forces nouvelles (PFN),the GUD published the satiric monthly Alternative.

On 9 May 1994 GUD member  died after clashes between nationalists and riot police. Following these event, some French nationalist groups formed an umbrella organization Comité du 9-Mai (C9M) and holds yearly a commemorative marches in Paris on May 9.

In 1998, the Group united itself with Jeune Résistance and the Union des cercles résistance, offshoots of Nouvelle Résistance  group, under the name Unité Radicale, but it was dissolved after Maxime Brunerie's failed assassination attempt on president Jacques Chirac.

In 2004, the GUD reformed under the name . Its publication was Le Dissident. 

In 2017 members of the GUD squatted a building in Lyon and founded political movement Social Bastion.

Its activists were reported to be drawn from far-right trade union , the ultra-right group the Zouaves, traditionalist Catholics from Versailles, and football hooligans.

Members 
Successive leaders of the GUD were: Alain Robert, Jack Marchal, Jean-François Santacroce, Serge Rep, Philippe Cuignache, Charles-Henri Varaut, Frédéric Chatillon, William Bonnefoy, Benoît Fleury.

Military volunteers 
Some GUD members have fought in Lebanese Civil War in 1976, Croatian War of Independence in the 1990s and in Burma during Karen conflict. In 1985 member of the GUD Jean-Philippe Courrèges was killed in action fighting for the Karen National Liberation Army.

GUD members have had links with the Department for Protection and Security, which is the security organization of the far-right political party National Front.

Former member of the GUD  was member of the FLNC.

See also
 History of far-right movements in France
 Federation of Nationalist Students
 Youth Front (Italy)

References

Bibliography 
 Frédéric Chatillon, Thomas Lagane et Jack Marchal (dir.), Les Rats maudits. Histoire des étudiants nationalistes 1965-1995, Éditions des Monts d'Arrée, 1995, .
 Roger Griffin, Net gains and GUD reactions: patterns of prejudice in a Neo-fascist groupuscule, Patterns of Prejudice, vol. 33, n°2, 1999, p. 31-50.
 Collectif, Bêtes et méchants. – Petite histoire des jeunes fascistes français, Paris, Éditions Reflex, 2002, .

External links
GUD - Histoire des étudiants nationalistes 1965-1995 (History of nationalist students 1965-1995)

Student societies in France
Far-right politics in France
French nationalism
Anti-communist organizations
Neo-fascist organizations
Third Position